The Osaka Meibutsu Sekaiichi Championship (Osaka World's Best Attraction Championship) was a secondary professional wrestling title contested in the Japanese pro wrestling promotion Osaka Pro Wrestling.  The title was established in 2001 when Kuishinbo Kamen defeated Ebessan to win the championship.

One of the vacancies came when Okita-hun vacated the title due to an ear injury on September 16, 2009.

Title history

List of combined reigns

References

External links

World's Best